Emre Batur (born 21 April 1988) is a Turkish volleyball player. He played for Fenerbahçe Grundig since 2005 before he transferred to Halkbank Ankara in the 2012-13 season. He played 25 times for national team. He also played for Tokat Plevne Belediyesi.

He won the bronze medal at the 2010 Men's European Volleyball League and the silver medal at the 2012 Men's European Volleyball League with the national team. He was awarded the title "Most Valuable Player" at the 2012 European League. Batur won the Men's CEV Cup 2012–13 with Halkbank Ankara.

Awards

Individual
 2010 Turkish Men's Volleyball League -  "Best Server"
 2011 Turkish Men's Volleyball League - "Best Blocker"
 2012 European League - "Most Valuable Player"
 2013 Turkish Men's Volleyball League - "Payidar Demir Special Award"

National team
 2010 European League -  Bronze Medal
 2012 European League -  Silver Medal

Clubs
Fenerbahçe SK
 2005-06 Turkish Men's Volleyball League -  Runner-up
 2007-08 Turkish Cup -  Champion
 2007-08 Turkish Men's Volleyball League -  Champion
 2008-09 Turkish Men's Volleyball League -  Runner-up
 2008-09 CEV Champions League Top 16
 2009-10 Balkan Cup -  Champion
 2009-10 Turkish Men's Volleyball League -  Champion
 2010-11 Turkish Men's Volleyball League -  Champion
 2011-12 Turkish Men's Volleyball League -  Champion
 2011-12 Turkish Volleyball Cup -  Champion
 2011-12 Turkish Volleyball Super Cup -  Champion
 2018-19 Turkish Volleyball Cup -  Champion
 2018-19 Turkish Men's Volleyball League -  Champion
Halkbank Ankara
 2013 CEV Cup  -  Champion
 2014/2015  Turkish Championship, with Halkbank Ankara
 2012/2013  Turkish SuperCup 2013, with Halkbank Ankara
 2013/2014  Turkish SuperCup 2014, with Halkbank Ankara
 2014/2015  Turkish SuperCup 2015, with Halkbank Ankara
 2015/2016  Turkish Championship, with Halkbank Ankara
 2016/2017  Turkish Championship, with Halkbank Ankara
 2012-13 Turkish Volleyball Cup -  Champion
 2013-14 Turkish Volleyball Cup -  Champion
 2014-15 Turkish Volleyball Cup -  Champion

References

External links

 

1988 births
Living people
Sportspeople from Tokat
Turkish men's volleyball players
Fenerbahçe volleyballers
Halkbank volleyball players
Middle blockers
21st-century Turkish people